Socialist Party is the name of many different political parties around the world. The list of parties using the exact name "Socialist Party" is to be found in the Socialist Party article.

Socialist Party may also refer to the wide variety of political parties that use the word "Socialist" in their names, often in conjunction with other adjectives and political labels. What follows is an incomplete alphabetical list of such parties:

Names used by several different parties 
Arab Socialist Ba'ath Party (disambiguation)
Authentic Socialist Party (disambiguation)
Democratic Socialist Party (disambiguation)
Independent Socialist Party (disambiguation)
National Socialist Party (disambiguation)
New Socialist Party (disambiguation)
Polish Socialist Party (disambiguation)
Popular Socialist Party (disambiguation)
Revolutionary Socialist Party (disambiguation)
Socialist Action Party (disambiguation)
Socialist Democratic Party (disambiguation)
Socialist Equality Party (disambiguation)
Socialist Labor Party (disambiguation)
Socialist Labour Party (disambiguation)
Socialist Left Party (disambiguation)
Socialist People's Party (disambiguation)
Socialist Republican Party (disambiguation)
Socialist Unity (disambiguation)
Socialist Unity Party (disambiguation)
Socialist Workers Party (disambiguation)
Unified or Unitary or United Socialist Party (disambiguation)

Africa

Egypt
Egyptian Arab Socialist Party
Egyptian Socialist Party
Liberal Socialists Party
Socialist Party of Egypt
Socialist Popular Alliance Party

Other African countries
Liberal Socialist Party (Angola), Angola
Burkinabé Socialist Party, Burkina Faso
Party for Democracy and Progress / Socialist Party, Burkina Faso
Gabonese Socialist Party, Gabon
Socialist Party of Guinea, Guinea
Socialist Party of Guinea-Bissau, Guinea-Bissau
Party of the Unified Socialist Left, Morocco
Socialist Party (Morocco), Morocco
Socialist Workers and Farmers Party of Nigeria, Nigeria
Rwandese Socialist Party, Rwanda
Senegalese Socialist Party, Senegal
Socialist Party of Senegal, Senegal
Socialist Party of Azania, South Africa
Islamic Socialist Party, Sudan
Pan-African Socialist Party, Togo
Socialist Destourian Party, Tunisia
Socialist Party, Tunisia
Zairian Socialist Party, Zaire

Asia
Assyrian Socialist Party

India
Congress Socialist Party
French India Socialist Party
Kerala Socialist Party
Mahe Socialist Party
Praja Socialist Party
Punjab Socialist Party
Samyukta Socialist Party
Socialist Janata (Democratic) Party
Socialist Party (India)
Socialist Party (Marxist)
Socialist Unity Centre of India (Communist)
West Bengal Socialist Party
World Socialist Party of India

Japan
Leftist Socialist Party of Japan
Okinawa Social Mass Party
Rightist Socialist Party of Japan

Turkey
Ottoman Socialist Party
Revolutionary Communist Party of Turkey – Socialist Unity
Socialist Democracy Party
Turkish Workers and Peasants Socialist Party

Other Asian countries
Socialist Party of Bangladesh, Bangladesh
Burma Socialist Party, Burma
Burma Socialist Programme Party, Burma
Socialist Party (Iran), Iran
Socialist Party of Iran, Iran
Nasserist Socialist Vanguard Party, Iraq
Ata Meken Socialist Party, Kyrgyzstan
Progressive Socialist Party, Lebanon
Nepal Samata Party (Socialist), Nepal
Pakistan Socialist Party, Pakistan
Socialist Party (South Korea), South Korea
Socialist Party of Sri Lanka, Sri Lanka
Sri Lanka Freedom Socialist Party, Sri Lanka
Socialist Cooperation Party, Syria
Socialist Party of Tajikistan, Tajikistan
Socialist Party of Thailand, Thailand
Socialist Party of Vietnam, Vietnam
Yemeni Socialist Party, Yemen

Europe
Group of the Party of European Socialists
International Working Union of Socialist Parties
Party of European Socialists

Belgium
Belgian Socialist Party
Socialist Party (Belgium)
Socialist Party Different
Left Socialist Party (Belgium)
Republican Socialist Party

France
French Socialist Party (1902)
French Socialist Party (1919)
Radical-Socialist Party Camille Pelletan
Republican-Socialist Party
Socialist Party (France)
Socialist Party of France – Jean Jaurès Union
Socialist Party of France (1902)
Socialist Revolutionary Party (France)
Workers and Peasants' Socialist Party

Ireland
Cork Socialist Party
Socialist Party (Ireland)
Socialist Party of Ireland (1971)

Italy
Italian Reformist Socialist Party
Italian Socialist Party
Italian Socialist Party (2007)
Italian Socialist Party of Proletarian Unity
New Italian Socialist Party
Reformist Socialist Party
Socialist Party (Italy, 1996)

Netherlands
Pacifist Socialist Party
Socialist Party (Netherlands)
Socialist Party (Netherlands, interbellum)

Portugal
Portuguese Socialist Party
Socialist Party (Portugal)
Workers Party of Socialist Unity

Romania
Romanian Socialist Party
Socialist Alliance Party
Socialist Party of Labour
Socialist Party of Romania

Russia
Socialist Party
United Socialist Party of Russia

San Marino
Party of Socialists and Democrats
Sammarinese Independent Democratic Socialist Party
Sammarinese Reformist Socialist Party
Sammarinese Socialist Party
New Socialist Party (San Marino)
Socialist Party (San Marino)

Spain
Radical Socialist Republican Party
Socialist Canarian Party
Socialist Party of the People of Ceuta
Socialist Party of Catalonia-Congress
Socialist Party of Majorca
Socialist Party of the Basque Country–Basque Country Left
Socialist Party of the Islands
Socialist Party of the Valencian Country
Socialists' Party of Catalonia
Socialists' Party of Galicia
Valencian Socialist Party

Sweden
Left Socialist Party (Sweden)
Socialist Justice Party
Socialist Party (Sweden, 1929)
Socialist Party (Sweden, 1971)

United Kingdom
British Socialist Party
Socialist Party (England and Wales)
Socialist Party of Great Britain

Scotland
Scottish Republican Socialist Party
Scottish Socialist Party
Scottish Socialist Party United Left
Socialist Party Scotland

Other United Kingdom countries
Irish Republican Socialist Party, Northern Ireland
Socialist Party Wales, Wales

Other European countries
Albanian Socialist Alliance Party, Albania
Socialist Party of Albania, Albania
Belarusian Socialist Sporting Party, Belarus
Socialist Party (Bosnia and Herzegovina), Bosnia and Herzegovina
Bulgarian Social Democratic Workers Party (Broad Socialists), Bulgaria
Bulgarian Socialist Party, Bulgaria
Provincial Christian-Socialist Party, Czechoslovakia
Socialist Party of the Czechoslovak Working People, Czechoslovakia
Serbian Party of Socialists (Croatia), Croatia
Socialist Party of Croatia, Croatia
Georgian Socialist-Federalist Revolutionary Party, Georgia
German Socialist Party, Germany
Socialist Reich Party, Germany
Fighting Socialist Party of Greece, Greece
Socialist Party of Greece, Greece
Hungarian Socialist Party, Hungary
People's Unity Party – Socialist Party, Iceland
Socialist Party of Latvia, Latvia
Socialist Workers and Peasants Party of Latvia, Latvia
Socialist Party of Lithuania, Lithuania
Radical Socialist Party (Luxembourg), Luxembourg
Socialist Party of Macedonia, Macedonia
Party of Socialists of the Republic of Moldova, Moldova
Socialist Party of Moldova, Moldova
Democratic Party of Socialists of Montenegro, Montenegro
People's Socialist Party of Montenegro, Montenegro
Silesian Socialist Party, Poland
Socialist Party of Serbia, Serbia
Socialist Party of Slovenia, Slovenia
Progressive Socialist Party of Ukraine, Ukraine
Socialist Party of Ukraine, Ukraine
Socialist Party of Yugoslavia, Yugoslavia
Socialist Party of Yugoslavia (2002), Yugoslavia

North America

Canada

National
New Democratic Party Socialist Caucus
Socialist Party of Canada
Socialist Party of Canada (WSM)
United Canadian Socialist Party
Socialist Party of North America
World Socialist Party of Canada

Local
Socialist Party of Alberta, Alberta
Socialist Party of Canada (British Columbia), British Columbia
Socialist Party of Canada (Manitoba), Manitoba
Socialist Party of Ontario, Ontario

Cuba
Cuban Socialist Party
Socialist Party of Manzanillo
Socialist Party of the Island of Cuba

United States

National
African People's Socialist Party
Freedom Socialist Party
Left Wing Section of the Socialist Party
Socialist Party of America
Socialist Party USA
Socialist Union Party
World Socialist Party of the United States

Local
Socialist Party of California, California
Socialist Party of Colorado, Colorado
Socialist Party of Connecticut, Connecticut
Socialist Party of Florida, Florida
Chicago Socialist Party, Illinois
Socialist Party of Kansas, Kansas
Socialist Party of Massachusetts, Massachusetts
Socialist Party of Michigan, Michigan
Socialist Party of Minnesota, Minnesota
Socialist Party of New Jersey, New Jersey
Socialist Party of New York, New York
Socialist Party of Ohio, Ohio
Socialist Party of Oklahoma, Oklahoma
Socialist Party of Oregon, Oregon
Puerto Rican Socialist Party, Puerto Rico
Socialist Party (Puerto Rico), Puerto Rico
Socialist Party of Texas, Texas
Socialist Party of Washington, Washington
Socialist Party of Wisconsin, Wisconsin

Other North American countries
Vanguard Nationalist and Socialist Party, Bahamas
Socialist Party (Guatemala), Guatemala
Socialist Mexican Party, Mexico
Socialist Party of Mexico, Mexico
Socialist Party (Panama), Panama
Workers' Socialist Party (Panama), Panama
Caribbean Socialist Party, Trinidad and Tobago
Trades Union Congress and Socialist Party, Trinidad and Tobago

Oceania

Indonesia
Socialist Party (Indonesia)
Socialist Party of Indonesia
Socialist Party of Indonesia (Parsi)

Other countries in Oceania
Socialist Party (Australia), Australia
Victorian Socialist Party, Australia
Socialist Party of Timor, East Timor
New Zealand Socialist Party, New Zealand
World Socialist Party (New Zealand), New Zealand
Liberal Socialist Party, Singapore

South America

Argentina
Argentine Socialist Vanguard Party
Socialist Party (Argentina)
Socialist Party of the National Left

Bolivia
Socialist Party (Bolivia, 1971)
Socialist Party-1
Workers Socialist Party of Bolivia

Peru
Socialist Democrat Party
Socialist Party (Peru)
Socialist Party of Peru (1930)
Socialist Vanguard Party

Other South American countries
Brazilian Socialist Party, Brazil
Socialist Party of Chile, Chile
Socialist Party – Broad Front of Ecuador, Ecuador
Guianese Socialist Party, French Guiana
Nicaraguan Socialist Party, Nicaragua
Nicaraguan Socialist Party (de los Sánchez), Nicaragua
Socialist Party of Uruguay, Uruguay

See also
 List of Socialist Party mayors (United States)
 List of Socialist Party of Great Britain members